The 12th Central American and Caribbean Junior Championships was held in San Salvador, El Salvador, between 14–16 July 1996.

Medal summary
Medal winners are published by category: Junior A, Male, Junior A, Female, and Junior B.  Complete results can be found on the World Junior Athletics History website.

Male Junior A (under 20)

Female Junior A (under 20)

Male Junior B (under 17)

Female Junior B (under 17)

Medal table (unofficial)

Participation (unofficial)

Anguilla and Aruba competed for the first time at the championships. Detailed result lists can be found on the World Junior Athletics History website.  An unofficial count yields a new record number of about 524 athletes (293 junior (under-20) and 231 youth (under-17)) from about 20 countries:

 (1)
 (4)
 (2)
 (12)
 (18)
 (4)
 (53)
 (69)
 (38)
 (44)
 (18)
 (6)
 (57)
 México (111)
 (5)
 (1)
 Panamá (24)
 (52)
 (2)
 (3)

References

External links
Official CACAC Website

Central American and Caribbean Junior Championships in Athletics
International athletics competitions hosted by El Salvador
1996 in Salvadoran sport
Central American and Caribbean Junior Championships
1996 in youth sport